Smile 90.4FM is a South African private commercial radio station based in Cape Town in the Western Cape. It mainly plays music from the 1980s, along with South African music. It launched in 2013.

Broadcast Languages
English
Afrikaans

Target Audience
Age Group 35 - 49

References

Radio stations in Cape Town